Keith Ansell-Pearson is a British philosopher specialising in the work of Friedrich Nietzsche, Henri Bergson and Gilles Deleuze. He is currently Professor of Philosophy at Warwick University.

Ansell-Pearson is the author of numerous books including Germinal Life, Viroid Life and Philosophy and the Adventure of the Virtual.

Career 
Ansell-Pearson graduated from the University of Sussex and taught at the University of Malawi in southern Africa and Queen Mary College in London. He joined the Philosophy Department of the University of Warwick in 1993 and has held a Personal Chair since 1998.

He is on the editorial boards of Journal of Nietzsche Studies, Nietzsche-Studien, Deleuze Studies, Cosmos and History and the book series Nietzsche Now. He serves on the scientific committee of Nietzscheana.

Work 
Ansell-Pearson is known for his work on Nietzsche, Bergson, and Deleuze, and for exploring their work in the context of modern biophilosophy. Lately he has been focusing on Nietzsche's neglected middle period texts, especially Daybreak.

Selected bibliography

References

External links 
"Bergson", in Dean Moyar (ed.), The Routledge Companion to Nineteenth Century Philosophy (Routledge, 2010), pp. 403-33.
"Responses to Evolution: Spencer's Evolutionism, Bergsonism, and Contemporary Biology" (with Paul-Antoine Miquel & Michael Vaughan), The History of Continental Philosophy, volume three (Acumen/University of Chicago Press, 2010), pp. 347-79.
"Bergson and Ethics", in Hugh LaFollette, The International Encyclopedia of Ethics (Wiley-Blackwell, 2013), pp. 513-520.
Beyond the Human State: Bergson, Education and the Art of Life
The Future is Subhuman. Review of Malcolm Bull's Anti-Nietzsche (2011)
Philosophy of the Acrobat: On Peter Sloterdijk. On Sloterdijk's You Must Change your Life and The Art of Philosophy: Wisdom as a Practice
Nietzsche, the Middle Period - Interview at 3:AM Magazine

Academics of the University of Warwick
Living people
Alumni of the University of Sussex
Academic staff of the University of Malawi
Academics of Queen Mary University of London
1960 births